Alex Friesen (born January 30, 1991) is a Canadian professional ice hockey forward currently playing for the Fischtown Pinguins in the Deutsche Eishockey Liga (DEL). He was selected by the Vancouver Canucks in the 6th round (172nd overall) in the 2010 NHL Entry Draft.

Playing career
Friesen played his junior ice hockey career with the Niagara Ice Dogs of the Ontario Hockey League. He scored his first pro-goal on February 1, 2013 against the Milwaukee Admirals while playing with the Chicago Wolves. He was a member of the Utica Comets team that made it to the Calder Cup Finals in 2015, they lost to the Manchester Monarchs in 5 games.

On June 22, 2015, Friesen signed a two-year contract extension worth $575,000. During the 2015–16 season, Friesen made his NHL debut on February 15, 2016, with the Canucks in a 5-2 loss to the Minnesota Wild.

On July 2, 2016, having left the Canucks as a free agent, Friesen agreed to a one-year, two-way contract with the St. Louis Blues. In his return to the Chicago Wolves in the 2016–17 season, Friesen's offensive production dropped in registering just 3 goals and 12 points in 76 games.

As an impending free agent, Friesen opted to pursue a European career, agreeing to an initial one-year deal with Leksands IF of the HockeyAllsvenskan on June 6, 2017. In his debut season in Sweden in 2017–18, Friesen adapted his offensive game in scoring 44 points in 52 games with Leksands.

At the conclusion of his contract, Friesen left as a free agent and agreed to a two-year contract with German outfit, Fischtown Pinguins of the DEL, on June 29, 2018.

Career statistics

References

External links
 

1991 births
Living people
Chicago Wolves players
Fischtown Pinguins players
Ice hockey people from Ontario
Leksands IF players
Kalamazoo Wings (ECHL) players
Niagara IceDogs players
Sportspeople from St. Catharines
Utica Comets players
Vancouver Canucks draft picks
Vancouver Canucks players
Canadian ice hockey centres
Canadian expatriate ice hockey players in Germany
Canadian expatriate ice hockey players in Sweden